Coit may refer to:

People
Adela Coit (1863–1932) German women's suffragist
Coit Albertson, American actor
Coit D. Blacker, Special Assistant to the President
Daniel Coit Gilman, American educator
James Milnor Coit, American teacher
John Coit Spooner, senator from Wisconsin
Joshua Coit: American lawyer and politician
Judson B. Coit Observatory, the astronomical observatory of the Boston University
Lillie Hitchcock Coit, firefighter and eccentric
Madelin Coit, American multi-media artist 
Moses Coit Tyler, American author
Stanton Coit, writer on ethics

Other
Coit Tower, landmark in San Francisco
Battle of Cat Coit Celidon, a battle in Arthurian legends

See also
 Koit (disambiguation)
 Quoit (disambiguation)